Richard Joseph Durbin (born November 21, 1944) is an American lawyer and politician serving as the senior United States senator from Illinois, a seat he has held since 1997. A member of the Democratic Party, Durbin is in his fifth Senate term and has served as the Senate Democratic whip since 2005 (the second-highest position in the Democratic leadership in the Senate) and as the Senate majority whip since 2021. He chairs the Senate Judiciary Committee, and led the Ketanji Brown Jackson Supreme Court nomination hearings. 

Durbin was born in East St. Louis, Illinois. He graduated from the School of Foreign Service and the Georgetown University Law Center. Working in state legal counsel throughout the 1970s, he made an unsuccessful run for lieutenant governor of Illinois in 1978. Durbin was elected to the U.S. House of Representatives in 1982, representing the Springfield-based 20th congressional district. 

After serving seven House terms, Durbin was elected to the U.S. Senate in 1996 and reelected in 2002, 2008, 2014, and 2020. He has served as the Senate Democratic whip since 2005—under Harry Reid until 2017, and under Chuck Schumer since 2017. During that time, he had two stints as Senate majority whip (from 2007 to 2015, and since 2021), and two as minority whip (from 2005 to 2007 and from 2015 to 2021). He is the dean of Illinois's congressional delegation.

Early life, education and career
Durbin was born in East St. Louis, Illinois, to an Irish-American father, William Durbin, and a Lithuanian-born mother, Anna (née Kutkin; Lithuanian: Ona Kutkaitė). He graduated from Assumption High School in East St. Louis in 1962. During his high school years he worked at a meatpacking plant. He earned a B.S. from the School of Foreign Service at Georgetown University in 1966. Durbin interned in Senator Paul Douglas's office during his senior year in college, and worked on Douglas's unsuccessful 1966 reelection campaign. Durbin adopted the nickname "Dick", which he did not previously use, after Douglas mistakenly called him by that name.

Durbin earned his J.D. from Georgetown University Law Center in 1969 and was admitted to the Illinois bar later that year. After graduating from law school, Durbin started a law practice in Springfield. He was legal counsel to Lieutenant Governor Paul Simon from 1969 to 1972, and then legal counsel to the Illinois State Senate Judiciary Committee from 1972 to 1982. Durbin was an unsuccessful Democratic candidate for the Illinois State Senate in 1976. He ran for lieutenant governor in 1978 as the running mate of State Superintendent of Schools Michael Bakalis. They were defeated by Republican incumbents Jim Thompson and Dave O'Neal. Durbin then worked as an adjunct professor at the Southern Illinois University School of Medicine for five years while maintaining his law practice.

U.S. House of Representatives
In 1982, Durbin won the Democratic nomination for the now-eliminated 20th congressional district, which included Macon and most of Springfield. He scored a 1,400-vote victory, defeating 22-year incumbent Paul Findley, a U.S. Navy veteran, whose district lines had been substantially redrawn to remove rural farms and add economically depressed Macon, replacing 35% of the voters and including more Democrats as part of the decennial redistricting. Durbin's campaign emphasized unemployment and financial difficulties facing farmers, and told voters that electing him would send "a message to Washington and to President Reagan that our economic policies are not working." Durbin benefited from donations by pro-Israel groups, especially AIPAC, that opposed Findley's advocacy on behalf of the Palestine Liberation Organization in the year before the election. Durbin was reelected six times, rarely facing serious opposition, and winning more than 55% of the vote in each election except 1994.

U.S. Senate

In 1996, Durbin defeated Pat Quinn to become the Democratic nominee to replace the retiring incumbent, Senator Paul Simon, a longtime friend. He faced Republican State Representative Al Salvi in the general election. Although the election had been expected to be competitive, Durbin benefited from Bill Clinton's 18-point win in Illinois that year and defeated Salvi by 15 points. He was reelected in 2002, 2008, 2014 and 2020, each time by at least 10 points.

Committees
 Committee on Appropriations
 Subcommittee on Defense
 Subcommittee on Financial Services and General Government
 Subcommittee on Labor, Health and Human Services, Education, and Related Agencies
 Subcommittee on State, Foreign Operations, and Related Programs
 Subcommittee on Transportation, Housing and Urban Development, and Related Agencies
 Committee on the Judiciary (chair) 
 Subcommittee on the Constitution 
 Subcommittee on Crime and Drugs
 Subcommittee on Immigration, Refugees and Border Security
 Subcommittee on Terrorism, Technology and Homeland Security
 Subcommittee on Human Rights and the Law
 Committee on Agriculture, Nutrition, and Forestry

Caucus memberships
 Bi-Cameral High-Speed & Intercity Passenger Rail Caucus
 Caucus on International Narcotics Control (co-chair)
 International Conservation Caucus
Senate Diabetes Caucus
Senate Hunger Caucus (co-chair)
Senate Science, Technology, Engineering, and Math Education Caucus (co-chair)
 Sportsmen's Caucus
Congressional COPD Caucus (co-chair)
 Senate Ukraine Caucus (co-chair)
Afterschool Caucuses
Congressional NextGen 9-1-1 Caucus

Leadership 

In November 1998, Senate Minority Leader Tom Daschle appointed Durbin Assistant Democratic Whip. After the 2004 election, Durbin became the Democratic Whip in the 109th Congress. He became the first senator from Illinois to serve as a Senate Whip since Everett Dirksen in the late 1950s, and the fifth to serve in Senate leadership. Durbin served as assistant minority leader from 2005 to 2007, when the Democrats became the majority party in the Senate. He then assumed the role of assistant majority leader, or majority whip.

In addition to his caucus duties, Durbin chairs the Subcommittee on Human Rights and the Subcommittee on Financial Services and General Government.

In 2000, Democratic presidential nominee Al Gore reportedly considered asking Durbin to be his running mate for Vice President of the United States. Gore ultimately chose Connecticut Senator Joe Lieberman.

When Majority Leader Harry Reid faced a difficult reelection fight in 2010, some pundits predicted a possibly heated fight to succeed him between Durbin and Senator Chuck Schumer, who is well known for his fund-raising prowess. Reid's reelection rendered such speculation moot. In 2021, Durbin became Senate Majority Whip again for the 117th Congress, as well as becoming chair of the Senate Judiciary Committee. This is the first time that the whip of either party has served as chair of this committee.

Political positions

In 2006, the National Journal rated Durbin as the most liberal U.S. senator. According to the 2019 Govtrack report card, he had the tenth-most left-leaning voting record in the Senate. 

In 2019, Durbin co-signed a Senate resolution affirming support of a Two-State Solution and opposition to a proposed Israeli annexation of the West Bank.

The American Conservative Union gave him a 5% lifetime conservative rating in 2020.

Social issues

Abortion 
During his first  term as congressman, Durbin supported upholding existing restrictions on abortion or impose new limitations, including supporting a Constitutional amendment that would have nullified Roe v. Wade. Beginning in his second Senate term, he reversed his position and has since voted to maintain access to abortion, including support for Medicaid funding of it, and opposed any limitation he considers a practical or potential encroachment upon Roe. Durbin has maintained that this reversal came about due to personal reflection and his growing awareness of potentially harmful implications of his previous policy with respect to women facing dangerous pregnancies. He said, "I still oppose abortion and would try my best to convince any woman in my family to carry the baby to term. But I believe that ultimately the decision must be made by the woman, her doctor, her family, and her conscience."

In September 2020, Durbin voted to confirm judges Stephen McGlynn and David W. Dugan, who have criticized Supreme Court rulings such as Roe, to lifetime appointments to the federal judiciary in Illinois. Durbin opposed the 2022 overturning of Roe v. Wade, saying, "millions of Americans are waking up in a country where they have fewer rights than their parents and grandparents."

Criminal justice reform 
In July 2017, Durbin, Cory Booker, Elizabeth Warren, and Kamala Harris introduced the Dignity for Incarcerated Women Act, legislation implementing a ban on the shackling of pregnant women and mandating the Federal Bureau of Prisons to form superior visitation policies for parents along with providing parenting classes and health products such as tampons and pads. The bill also restricted prison employees from entering restrooms of the opposite sex except in pressing circumstances.

In December 2018, Durbin voted for the First Step Act, legislation aimed at reducing recidivism rates among federal prisoners by expanding job training and other programs in addition to expanding early-release programs and modifying sentencing laws such as mandatory minimum sentences for nonviolent drug offenders, "to more equitably punish drug offenders."

Gun Control 
Durbin received an "F" grade from the National Rifle Association for his consistent support for gun control. Durbin supports a national assault weapon ban.

Durbin sent Attorney General Jeff Sessions a letter in May 2017 asking for support in expanding the Chicago Police Department's violence prevention programs by expanding access to the Strategic Decision Support Centers and the National Integrated Ballistic Information Network. He also asked the Justice Department to support the Stop Illegal Trafficking in Firearms Act, which would stop illegal state-to-state gun trafficking.

In response to mass shootings, such as the Orlando nightclub shooting and Las Vegas shooting, Durbin has repeatedly called for expanded gun control laws, saying that Congress would be "complicit" in the shooting deaths of people if it did not act.

After the October 2017 Las Vegas shooting, Durbin was one of 24 senators to sign a letter to National Institutes of Health Director Francis Collins espousing the view that it was critical that the NIH "dedicate a portion of its resources to the public health consequences of gun violence" at a time when 93 Americans die per day from gun-related fatalities and noted that the Dickey Amendment did not prohibit objective, scientific inquiries into shooting death prevention.

In January 2019, Durbin was one of 40 senators to introduce the Background Check Expansion Act, a bill that would require background checks for either the sale or transfer of all firearms including all unlicensed sellers. Exceptions to the bill's background check requirement included transfers between members of law enforcement, loaning firearms for either hunting or sporting events temporarily, providing firearms as gifts to members of one's immediate family, firearms transferred as part of an inheritance, or giving a firearm to another person temporarily for immediate self-defense.

HIV/AIDS 
In March 2007, Durbin introduced the African Health Capacity Investment Act of 2007 to the Senate. The bill was designed so that over three years, the U.S. would supply over $600 million to help create safer medical facilities and working conditions, and to recruit and train doctors from all over North America.

In December 2007, Durbin and two other senators co-sponsored Senator John Kerry's Nondiscrimination in Travel and Immigration Act. In March 2007, he joined 32 other senators to co-sponsor the Early Treatment for HIV Act.

Immigration 

Durbin is the chief proponent of the Development, Relief and Education for Alien Minors (DREAM) Act. The bill would provide certain students who entered or were brought to the nation illegally with the opportunity to earn conditional permanent residency if they arrived in the U.S. as children; graduated from a U.S. high school; have been in the country continuously for at least five years before the bill's enactment; submit biometric data; pass a criminal background check; and complete two years toward a four-year degree from an accredited university or complete at least two years in the military within a five-year period. In 2013, the Immigrant Legal Resource Center presented Durbin with the inaugural Nancy Pelosi Award for Immigration & Civil Rights Policy for his leadership on this issue.

On January 28, 2013, Durbin was a member of a bipartisan group of eight senators, the Gang of Eight, which announced principles for comprehensive immigration reform (CIR).

In April 2018, Durbin was one of five senators to send acting director of Immigration and Customs Enforcement Thomas Homan a letter about standards the agency used to determine how to detain a pregnant woman, requesting that pregnant women not be held in custody except in extraordinary circumstances after reports "that ICE has failed to provide critical medical care to pregnant women in immigration detention—resulting in miscarriages and other negative health outcomes".

In July 2018, Durbin said Homeland Security Secretary Kirstjen Nielsen should resign over the Trump administration family separation policy. He argued it "is and was a cruel policy inconsistent with the bedrock values of the nation," adding someone "in this administration has to accept responsibility." Tyler Houlton, a DHS spokesman, replied on Twitter that "obstructionists in Congress should get to work".

In July 2019, after reports that the Trump administration intended to end protections of spouses, parents and children of active-duty service members from deportation, Durbin was one of 22 senators to sign a letter led by Tammy Duckworth arguing that the program allowed service members the ability "to fight for the United States overseas and not worry that their spouse, children, or parents will be deported while they are away" and that the program's termination would cause personal hardship for service members in combat.

In October 2019, Durbin blocked the passage of S.386, the Fairness for High-Skilled Immigrants Act, which aims to eliminate the per-country numerical limitation for all employment-based immigrants and to increase the per-country limitation for all family-sponsored immigrants from 7% to 15%. He was one of the original co-sponsors of a similar bill, in the 112th Congress (2011–2012). The only difference between the two versions is that S.1983 had the language "includes nationals of Ireland coming to the United States under a treaty of commerce to perform specialty occupation services" in the nonimmigrant E-3 visa category.

The Cato Institute, a libertarian think tank, argued, "The per country limits caused the backlog to develop unevenly. They result in an inequity between the proportion of applicants from certain countries and the proportion of green cards that nationals of those countries receive. The Indian backlog means that they carry almost the entire burden of the green card shortage. While they wait in line, nationals of other countries get to cut to the front of the line. Going forward, new EB2/EB3 applicants from India in 2019 will face astronomical wait times. At the current pace, it will take 49 years to process the Indian backlog—if people stick it out that long—and nearly 50,000 Indians would die before then. During that entire half century, other immigrants would keep bypassing Indians with almost no wait at all."

Durbin argued that bill S.386 would prioritize people of Indian and Chinese origin, who have been in the green card backlog for years, at the expense of future immigrants from other countries. After blocking S.386, he proposed his own bill, which would almost triple the number of employment-based green cards and eliminate country caps. Durbin agreed that his bill would not pass in the current administration and promised for a bipartisan agreement to pass S.386.

"The point is, it cannot pass. Not with Trump in office", said Aman Kapoor, the leader of Immigration Voice, an activist group. "Indians need a solution now", Kapoor said. "Every day, you see someone in the backlog is dying. Or kids are aging out. People are very stressed out because of the backlog." Proponents of S.386 argue it will be a fair first-in-first-out system in place of the current discriminatory system that has resulted in a decades-long backlog of high-skilled immigrants who have already applied for a green card. They also argue that basing employment green card allotment on an immutable characteristic like national origin goes against the spirit of Civil Rights Act of 1964, which outlaws national origin discrimination in employment, since national origin has no place in employment decisions. But opponents of the bill, mostly those who currently benefit from the birth-country reservation, argue that the discrimination argument is flawed, as getting a green card is not a protected right of any foreign worker. Opponents also argue that legislative proposals such as S.386 do not address the issue of too few employment-based green cards for an economy that has doubled in size since the law establishing their current statutory limits was passed in 1990. Opponents want to keep the per-country reservation in place in skilled immigration until visa numbers are increased.

Congressional Research Service (CRS) published a report stating that with the current immigration laws, the wait time for an Indian national of FY2020 would be 195 years, for a Chinese national 18 years, and for a national from any other country 0 years. Under amended S.386, the wait time for all applicants would be 37 years, regardless of their national origin by FY2030. Increasing green card numbers, along with ending per-country limits on employment-based green cards, would be an ideal solution.

The immigrants in backlog frustrated by Durbin's silence conducted several rallies, including a peaceful rally on July 4. On August 31, 2020, he released his hold and agreed to pass the bill with unanimous consent. Senator Rick Scott blocked the bill, seeking an 18,000 green-card reservation for people from certain countries.

Tobacco regulation 
In 1987, Durbin introduced major tobacco regulation legislation in the House. The bill banned cigarette smoking on airline flights of two hours or less. Representative C. W. Bill Young joined him in saying that the rights of smokers to smoke ends where their smoking affects other people's health and safety, such as on airplanes. The bill passed as part of the 1988 transportation spending bill. In 1989, Congress banned cigarette smoking on all domestic airline flights.

In March 1994, Durbin proposed an amendment to the Improving America's Schools Act that required schools receiving federal drug prevention money to teach elementary and secondary students about the dangers of tobacco, drugs, and alcohol. The amendment also required schools to warn students about tobacco and teach them how to resist peer pressure to smoke.

In February 2008, Durbin called on Congress to support a measure that would allow the Food and Drug Administration to oversee the tobacco industry. The measure would require companies to disclose the contents of tobacco products, restrict advertising and promotions, and mandate the removal of harmful ingredients from tobacco products. It would also prohibit tobacco companies from using terms like "low risk," "light," and "mild" on the packaging.

Durbin attributes his stance against tobacco smoking to his father, who smoked two packs of cigarettes a day and died of lung cancer.

Freedom of expression 
In 2007, speaking as Senate Majority Whip, Durbin said on record that "It's time to reinstitute the Fairness Doctrine."

In 2010, Durbin cosponsored and passed from committee the Combating Online Infringement and Counterfeits Act, a bill to combat media piracy by blacklisting websites. Many opposed to the bill argue that it violates First Amendment rights and promotes censorship. The announcement of the bill was followed by a wave of protest from digital rights activists, including the Electronic Frontier Foundation, calling it censorship and stating that action could be taken against all users of sites on which only some users are uploading infringing material.

Durbin sponsored the PROTECT IP Act.

Attempts to remove PAC radio advertisements 
In July 2014, Americas PAC, a Political Action Committee designed to elect conservative Republicans, released a radio advertisement attacking Durbin's staff salaries. This was based on a Washington Times article that stated Durbin's female staff members made $11,000 less annually than his male staffers. In response, lawyers representing Durbin submitted a letter claiming the information in the ad was false and that the radio stations would be liable for airing the ad, with the possibility of losing their FCC license. The radio station stated the sources provided to back up the information provided by Americas PAC were checked and verified and that they would keep the ad on air.

Economic issues

Child care 
In 2019, Durbin and 34 other senators introduced the Child Care for Working Families Act. The bill was expected to create 770,000 new child care jobs and ensure families under 75% of the state median income would not pay for child care, with higher-earning families having to pay "their fair share for care on a sliding scale, regardless of the number of children they have." The legislation also supported universal access to high-quality preschool programs for all three- and four-year-olds. Additionally, it would have changed child care compensation and training to aid both teachers and caregivers. The bill was referred to the Senate Committee on Health, Education, Labor, and Pensions, where it did not receive a hearing or vote.

Financial crisis of 2007–2010 

On April 27, 2009, in an interview with WJJG talk radio host Ray Hanania, Durbin accused banks of creating the financial crisis of 2007–2010. Durbin expressed a belief that many of the banks responsible for creating the crisis "own the place", referring to the power wielded by the banking lobby on Capitol Hill.

On September 18, 2008, Durbin attended a closed meeting with congressional leaders, then-Treasury Secretary Henry Paulson and Federal Reserve Chairman Ben Bernanke, and was urged to craft legislation to help financially troubled banks. That same day (trade effective the next day), Durbin sold mutual fund shares worth $42,696 and reinvested it all with Warren Buffett.

On February 26, 2009, Durbin introduced the Protecting Consumers from Unreasonable Credit Rates Act of 2009, calling for a maximum annual interest rate cap of 36%, including all interest and fees. The bill was intended to put an end to predatory lending activities.

Trade 
In January 2005, Durbin changed his longstanding position on sugar tariffs and price supports. After several years of voting to keep sugar quotas and price supports, he now favors abolishing the program. "The sugar program depended on congressmen like me from states that grew corn", Durbin said, referring to the fact that, though they were formerly a single entity, the sugar market and the corn syrup market are now largely separate.

In May 2006, Durbin campaigned to maintain a $0.54 per gallon tariff on imported ethanol. He justified the tariff by joining Barack Obama in stating that "ethanol imports are neither necessary nor a practical response to current gasoline prices", arguing instead that domestic ethanol production is sufficient and expanding. The American Coalition for Ethanol gave him a rating of 100%.

American Airlines praised Durbin for arguing for the need to lower rising oil prices.

Environment 
Among Durbin's legislative causes are environmental protection, particularly the protection of the Arctic National Wildlife Refuge. The League of Conservation Voters gives him a rating of 89%. Sierra Club gives him a 90% rating.

Rod Blagojevich 
Shortly after Governor Rod Blagojevich's arrest on federal corruption charges on December 9, 2008, Durbin called for the Illinois legislature to quickly pass legislation for a special election to fill then-President-elect Barack Obama's vacant Senate seat. He stated that no United States Senate appointment of Blagojevich's could produce a credible replacement.

Durbin and Senate Majority Leader Harry Reid led all 50 members of the Senate Democratic Caucus in writing Blagojevich to urge him to resign and not name a successor to Obama following Blagojevich's arrest.

Transportation 
Durbin has been a major proponent of expanded Amtrak funding and support.

Election finance 
Durbin reintroduced the Fair Elections Now Act during the 112th Congress. The bill would provide public funds to candidates who do not take political donations larger than $100 from any donor.

Foreign and military policy

China 
In April 2017, Durbin was one of eight Democratic senators to sign a letter to President Trump noting government-subsidized Chinese steel had been placed into the American market in recent years below cost and had hurt the domestic steel industry and the iron ore industry that fed it, calling on Trump to raise the steel issue with President of the People's Republic of China Xi Jinping in his meeting with him.

Darfur 
On March 2, 2005, then-Senator Jon Corzine presented the Darfur Peace and Accountability Act (S. 495) to the Senate. Durbin was one of 40 senators to co-sponsor the bill. The bill asked all people involved in or deemed in some way responsible for the genocide in Darfur to be denied visas and entrance to the U.S.

In 2006, Durbin co-sponsored the Durbin-Leahy Amendment to the Supplemental Appropriations bill for emergency funding to instill peace in Darfur. In 2006, he also co-sponsored the Lieberman Resolution and the Clinton Amendment.

On June 7, 2007, Durbin introduced the Sudan Disclosure Enforcement Act, which was aimed "at enhancing the U.S. Government's ability to impose penalties on violators of U.S. sanctions against Sudan." The bill called for the U.N. Security Council to vote on sanctions against the Sudanese Government for the genocide in Darfur.

Durbin has voted for all Darfur-related legislation. In addition to the Darfur Peace and Accountability Act, he also supported the Civilian Protection No-Fly Zone Act, the Hybrid Force Resolution, and the Sudan Divestment Authorization Act.

Myanmar 
In October 2017, Durbin condemned the genocide of the Rohingya Muslim minority in Myanmar and called for a stronger response to it.

Guantanamo Bay 
In 2005, Durbin compared the U.S. treatment of prisoners at Guantanamo Bay Naval Base to the atrocities committed by "Nazis, Soviets in their gulags, or some mad regime—Pol Pot or others—that had no concern for human beings." Demands that he apologize were initially rebuffed, but Durbin later apologized to the military for his remarks, which he said were "a very poor choice of words."

Guantanamo interrogation criticism 
Durbin received media attention on June 14, 2005, when in the U.S. Senate chambers he compared interrogation techniques used at Camp X-Ray, Guantanamo Bay, as reported by the Federal Bureau of Investigation, to those utilized by such regimes as Nazi Germany, the Soviet Union, and the Khmer Rouge:

Durbin's comments drew widespread criticism that comparing U.S. actions to such regimes insulted the United States and victims of genocide. Radio host Rush Limbaugh and White House deputy chief of staff Karl Rove accused him of treason, while former Speaker of the House Newt Gingrich called on the Senate to censure him. Chicago Mayor Richard Daley, whose son Patrick was serving in U.S. Army, also called on Durbin to apologize for his remarks, saying that he thought it was a "disgrace to say that any man or woman in the military would act like that." John Wertheim, Democratic state party chairman of New Mexico, and Jim Pederson, Arizona Democratic party chairman, also criticized Durbin's remarks. The leader of the Veterans of Foreign Wars also demanded an apology, as did the Anti-Defamation League.

Durbin initially did not apologize, but on June 21, 2005, he went before the Senate, saying, "More than most people, a senator lives by his words ... occasionally words fail us, occasionally we will fail words."

Former The New Republic editor Andrew Sullivan praised Durbin for raising serious moral issues about U.S. policy. Other commentators, including commentator Markos Moulitsas Zúniga of Daily Kos, condemned Durbin for apologizing to his critics, arguing he made a mistake in making himself, rather than detention and torture concerns at Guantanamo Bay, the focus of media coverage.

2001 invasion of Afghanistan 
Durbin voted to approve the Authorization for Use of Military Force Against Terrorists. This act granted the executive broad military powers and was used to justify the 2001 U.S. invasion of Afghanistan and later military interventions.

Iraq War 
On September 9, 2002, Durbin was the first of four Democratic senators (the others being Bob Graham, Dianne Feinstein, and Carl Levin) on the Select Committee on Intelligence (SSCI), responding to the Bush administration's request for a joint resolution authorizing a preemptive war on Iraq without having prepared a National Intelligence Estimate (NIE), to ask Central Intelligence Director George Tenet to prepare an NIE on the status of Iraq's Weapon of mass destruction programs. Durbin was also one of few senators who read the resulting October 1, 2002, NIE, Iraq's Continuing Programs for Weapons of Mass Destruction.

On September 29, 2002, Durbin held a news conference in Chicago to announce that "absent dramatic changes" in the resolution, he would vote against the resolution authorizing war on Iraq. On October 2, at the first high-profile Chicago anti-Iraq War rally in Federal Plaza, he repeated his promise to oppose the resolution in a letter read during the rally.

On October 10, the U.S. Senate failed to pass Durbin's amendment to the resolution to strike "the continuing threat posed by Iraq" and insert "an imminent threat posed by Iraq's weapons of mass destruction", by a 30–70 vote, with most Democratic senators voting for the amendment and 21 joining all 49 Republican senators voting against it. On October 11, Durbin was one of 23 senators to vote against the joint resolution authorizing the Iraq War.

On April 25, 2007, Durbin said that as an intelligence committee member he knew in 2002 from classified information that the Bush Administration was misleading the American people into a war on Iraq, but could not reveal this because, as an intelligence committee member, he was sworn to secrecy. This revelation prompted an online attack ad against Durbin by the National Republican Senatorial Committee.

Russia 
Durbin spearheaded a nonbinding resolution in July 2018 "warning President Trump not to let the Russian government question diplomats and other officials". The resolution states the U.S. "should refuse to make available any current or former diplomat, civil servant, political appointee, law enforcement official or member of the Armed Forces of the United States for questioning by the government of Vladimir Putin". It passed 98–0.

In December 2018, after United States Secretary of State Mike Pompeo announced the Trump administration was suspending its obligations in the Intermediate-Range Nuclear Forces Treaty in 60 days if Russia continued to violate the treaty, Durbin was one of 26 senators to sign a letter expressing concern over the administration "now abandoning generations of bipartisan U.S. leadership around the paired goals of reducing the global role and number of nuclear weapons and ensuring strategic stability with America's nuclear-armed adversaries" and calling on Trump to continue arms negotiations.

Saudi Arabia 
In March 2019, Durbin was one of 10 Democratic senators to sign a letter to Salman of Saudi Arabia requesting the release of human rights lawyer Waleed Abu al-Khair and writer Raif Badawi, women's rights activists Loujain al-Hathloul and Samar Badawi, and Dr. Walid Fitaih. The senators wrote, "Not only have reputable international organizations detailed the arbitrary detention of peaceful activists and dissidents without trial for long periods, but the systematic discrimination against women, religious minorities and mistreatment of migrant workers and others has also been well-documented."

Drone warfare 
In April 2013, Durbin chaired a hearing in the Senate Judiciary Subcommittee on the Constitution, Civil Rights and Human Rights about the moral, legal and constitutional issues surrounding targeted killings and the use of drones. Durbin said, "Many in the national security community are concerned that we may undermine our counterterrorism efforts if we do not carefully measure the benefits and costs of targeted killing."

Other positions 
In October 2007, Durbin opposed a bill in the Illinois General Assembly that would allow three casinos to be built, saying, "I really, really think we ought to stop and catch our breath and say, 'Is this the future of Illinois? That every time we want to do something we'll just build more casinos?'"

In August 2013, Durbin was one of 23 Democratic senators to sign a letter to the Defense Department warning of some payday lenders "offering predatory loan products to service members at exorbitant triple-digit effective interest rates and loan products that do not include the additional protections envisioned by the law" and asserting that service members and their families "deserve the strongest possible protections and swift action to ensure that all forms of credit offered to members of our armed forces are safe and sound."

In March 2018, Durbin was one of 10 senators to sign a letter spearheaded by Jeff Merkley lambasting a proposal by FCC Chairman Ajit Pai that would curb the scope of benefits from the Lifeline program during a period when roughly 6.5 million people in poor communities relied on Lifeline to receive access to high-speed internet, arguing that it was Pai's "obligation to the American public, as the Chairman of the Federal Communications Commission, to improve the Lifeline program and ensure that more Americans can afford access, and have means of access, to broadband and phone service." The senators also advocated insuring that "Lifeline reaches more Americans in need of access to communication services."

In April 2019, Durbin was one of 34 senators to sign a letter to Trump encouraging him "to listen to members of your own Administration and reverse a decision that will damage our national security and aggravate conditions inside Central America", asserting that Trump had "consistently expressed a flawed understanding of U.S. foreign assistance" since becoming president and that he was "personally undermining efforts to promote U.S. national security and economic prosperity" by preventing the use of Fiscal Year 2018 national security funding. The senators argued that foreign assistance to Central American countries created less migration to the U.S. by helping to improve conditions in those countries.

In April 2019, Durbin was one of six senators to send CFPB director Kathy Kraninger a letter expressing concern that "CFPB leadership has abandoned its supervision and enforcement activities related to federal student loan servicers" and opining that such behavior displayed "a shocking disregard for the financial well-being of our nation's public servants, including teachers, first responders, and members of the military." The senators requested that Kraninger clarify the CFPB's role in overseeing the Public Service Loan Forgiveness's student loan servicers handling since December 2017, such as examinations.

In April 2019, Durbin was one of 41 senators to sign a bipartisan letter to the housing subcommittee praising the United States Department of Housing and Urban Development's Section 4 Capacity Building program as authorizing "HUD to partner with national nonprofit community development organizations to provide education, training, and financial support to local community development corporations (CDCs) across the country" and expressing disappointment that Trump's budget "has slated this program for elimination after decades of successful economic and community development." The senators wrote of their hope that the subcommittee would support continued funding for Section 4 in Fiscal Year 2020.

In June 2019, Durbin was one of 15 senators to introduce the Affordable Medications Act, legislation intended to promote transparency by mandating that pharmaceutical companies disclose the amount of money going toward research and development in addition to both marketing and executives' salaries. The bill also abolished the restriction that stopped the federal Medicare program from using its buying power to negotiate lower drug prices for beneficiaries and hinder drug company monopoly practices used to keep prices high and disable less expensive generics entering the market.

In August 2019, Durbin, three other Senate Democrats, and Bernie Sanders signed a letter to Acting FDA Commissioner Ned Sharpless in response to Novartis falsifying data as part of an attempt to gain the FDA's approval for its new gene therapy Zolgensma, writing that it was "unconscionable that a drug company would provide manipulated data to federal regulators in order to rush its product to market, reap federal perks, and charge the highest amount in American history for its medication."

Durbin was participating in the 2021 United States Electoral College vote count when pro-Trump rioters attacked the U.S. Capitol. Along with other senators and staff, Durbin ran out of the Senate Chamber after the attackers, whom he called "extremists", breached the Capitol. He then evacuated to a secure location with Pelosi, McConnell and Schumer. Durbin blamed Trump for the attack. He also said Senator Josh Hawley was partially responsible for the attack. He called for Trump's removal through the invocation of the Twenty-fifth Amendment to the United States Constitution or impeachment.

Electoral history

Personal life

Family 
Durbin and his wife Loretta have had three children, Christine, Jennifer and Paul. After several weeks in the hospital with complications due to a congenital heart condition, Christine died on November 1, 2008, at age 40.

As of 2017, according to OpenSecrets.org, Durbin's net worth was more than $1.9 million.

Conflict of interest issues 
Durbin's wife was a lobbyist, and it was reported by the Chicago Tribune in 2014 that some of her "clients have received federal funding promoted by [Durbin]". In addition to announcing the award of monies to ten clients of his wife's lobbying firm, these conflicts included her lobbying firm receiving a one-year contract with a housing nonprofit group around the time Durbin went to bat for the organization; a state university receiving funds through an earmark by Durbin when his wife was its lobbyist; and Durbin arranging federal money for a public health nonprofit when his wife was seeking state support for the same group. The Durbins maintain that they try to avoid conflicts of interest.

Religion 
Durbin is Roman Catholic. In 2004, the Roman Catholic Diocese of Springfield in Illinois barred him from receiving communion because he voted against the Partial-Birth Abortion Ban Act. The current bishop of the diocese said Durbin stays away from his Springfield parish because "he doesn't want to make a scene". Durbin responded to the communion ban in 2004 that he is accountable to his constituents, even if it means defying Church teachings. In 2018, Bishop Thomas John Paprocki affirmed the decision to deny Durbin communion in the Springfield Diocese after Durbin's vote against the Pain-Capable Unborn Child Protection Act.

In 2017, Durbin was criticized for requesting a clarification from then Court of Appeals nominee Amy Coney Barrett during her Judiciary Committee confirmation hearing about her self-descriptive terminology "orthodox Catholic." He contended that might unfairly characterize Catholics who may not agree with the church's positions about abortion or the death penalty. She contended, "litigants and the general public are entitled to impartial justice, and that may be something that a judge who is heedful of ecclesiastical pronouncements cannot dispense." Barrett opined that judges aren't bound by precedent conflicting with the Constitution. She wrote that judges could recuse themselves from hearing matters if their faith conflicted with issues to be decided in cases they might otherwise hear. An article in the National Review contended, "Senators must inquire about these issues when considering lifetime appointments because ensuring impartiality and fidelity to precedent are critical for the rule of law." The issue prompted questions regarding the application of Article VI, Section 3 of the Constitution, which mandates: "No religious test shall ever be required as a qualification to any office or public trust under the United States."

Film and television appearances

See also
Trump–Ukraine scandal

Notes

References

Further reading

External links
 Senator Durbin official U.S. Senate website
 Dick Durbin  official campaign website
 
 

|-

|-

|-

|-

|-

|-

|-

|-

|-

|-

|-

1944 births
21st-century American politicians
American people of Irish descent
American people of Lithuanian descent
American Roman Catholics
Catholics from Illinois
Democratic Party members of the United States House of Representatives from Illinois
Democratic Party United States senators from Illinois
Walsh School of Foreign Service alumni
Georgetown University Law Center alumni
Illinois lawyers
Living people
People from East St. Louis, Illinois
People from St. Louis
Politicians from Springfield, Illinois
Recipients of the Order of the Cross of Terra Mariana, 1st Class